Dobra  is a town in Turek County, Greater Poland Voivodeship, Poland, with 1,333 inhabitants as of December 2021. Previously it belonged to Konin Voivodeship (1975-1998).

References

External links
 Official website (in Polish)
 Jewish community in Dobra on Virtual Shtetl

Cities and towns in Greater Poland Voivodeship
Dobra